The Libera Award for Best Breakthrough Artist is an award presented by the American Association of Independent Music at the annual Libera Award which recognizes "independent artist whose release exceeded a certain total of streams or equivalent sales" since 2012. The category was previously called Up & Comer Award in 2012 to 2014.

Winners and nominees

Notes

References

External links

Best Breakthrough Artist